The 2015 Big East men's basketball tournament, officially known as the 2015 Big East tournament, was a tournament played from March 11–14, at Madison Square Garden in New York City.

Seeds

Schedule

Bracket

All-Tournament team

Dylan Ennis, Villanova
Darrun Hilliard, Villanova
Jalen Reynolds, Xavier
D'Vauntes Smith-Rivera, Georgetown
Kris Dunn, Providence

Dave Gavitt Trophy (Most Outstanding Player)
Josh Hart, Villanova

See also
2015 Big East women's basketball tournament

Notes

References

External links
2015 Big East Men's Basketball Tournament 

Tournament
Big East men's basketball tournament
College sports tournaments in New York City
Basketball competitions in New York City
Sports in Manhattan
Big East men's basketball tournament
Big East men's basketball tournament
2010s in Manhattan